The 3rd constituency of Bács-Kiskun County is one of the single member constituencies of the National Assembly, the national legislature of Hungary. The constituency standard abbreviation: Bács-Kiskun 03. OEVK.

Since 2014, it has been represented by Sándor Font of the Fidesz–KDNP party alliance.

Geography
The 3rd constituency is located in western part of Bács-Kiskun County.

List of municipalities
The constituency includes the following municipalities:

History
The 3rd constituency of Bács-Kiskun County was created in 2011 and contained of the pre-2011 abolished constituencies of 6th and 7th and part of 4th constituency of this County. Its borders have not changed since its creation.

Members
The constituency was first represented by Sándor Font of the Fidesz from 2014, and he was re-elected in 2018 and 2022.

References

Bács-Kiskun 3rd